Hemant Shamsundar Kanitkar  (8 December 1942 – 9 June 2015) was an Indian cricketer who played in two Test matches in 1974. His son, Hrishikesh Kanitkar went on to represent India in the late 1990s.

References

1942 births
2015 deaths
India Test cricketers
Indian cricketers
West Zone cricketers
Maharashtra cricketers
People from Amravati
Cricketers from Maharashtra
Wicket-keepers